Under the Whyte notation for the classification of steam locomotives,  represents the wheel arrangement of four leading wheels on two axles, eight powered and coupled driving wheels on four axles and four trailing wheels on two axles. The type was first used by the Northern Pacific Railway, and initially named the Northern Pacific, but railfans and railroad employees have shortened the name since its introduction. It is most-commonly known as a Northern.

Overview

Development

The  wheel arrangement was a progression from the  Mountain type and, like the  Berkshire and  Hudson types, an example of the "Super Power" concept in steam locomotive design that made use of the larger firebox that could be supported by a four-wheel trailing truck, which allowed greater production of steam. The four-wheel leading truck gave stability at speed and the eight driving wheels gave greater adhesion. The evolution to the  type occurred in the United States of America soon after the Lima Locomotive Works introduced the concept of "Lima Super Power" in 1925, making heavy 2-8-2 and 2-8-4 locomotives. The prototype was built by American Locomotive Company (ALCO) for the Northern Pacific Railway (NP) in 1926, with a very large firebox with a  grate, designed to burn low quality lignite coal.

The  type arrived when nearly all the important steam locomotive design improvements had already been proven, including Superheaters, mechanical stokers, outside valve gear and the Delta trailing truck. One-piece, cast steel bed-frames with integrally cast cylinders gave the strength and rigidity to use Roller bearings. In 1930, the Timken Company used the Timken 1111, a  built by ALCO with roller bearings on all axles, to demonstrate the value of their sealed roller bearings. The Timken 1111 was subsequently sold to the NP, where it became NP No. 2626, their sole Class A-1 locomotive.

The stability of the  wheel arrangement meant that driving wheels up to  diameter could be used for high speed passenger and fast freight operation. Lateral control devices allowed these locomotives to traverse relatively sharp curves despite their  drivers. The increased boiler size possible with this type, together with the high axle loads permitted on mainlines in North America, resulted in the design of some massive locomotives, some of which weighed as much as 450 tons, including the tender. The  was suitable for both express passenger and fast freight service, though it was not suited to heavy drag freight trains.

Although locomotives of the  wheel arrangement were used in a number of countries, those that were developed outside North America included various design features which set them apart from North American practice. Scaled down examples of the type were exported by two American builders, ALCO and Baldwin Locomotive Works, for  lines in Brazil. Most were two-cylinder locomotives, but five classes of three-cylinder s were built:
 The simplex 06 class by the Deutsche Reichsbahn in Germany.
 The simplex H class by the Victorian Railways in Australia.
 The compound 242A1 class of the Société nationale des chemins de fer français (SNCF) in France.
 The simplex 477 class tank engines by CKD for Czechoslovak State Railways; 60 4-8-4T locomotives were built between 1951 and 1955, the last new steam engines built in Czechoslovakia. 
 An experimental high-pressure compound locomotive of the New York Central (NYC).

The Northern name
Most North American railroads used this name, but some adopted different names.
 "Heavy Mountain" or "New Mountain" on the Atchison, Topeka, and Santa Fe (ATSF). Original blueprints of class 3751 designate the 4-8-4 as a "Mountain" or "Heavy Mountain". The index to the blueprints reference the 3751 class as "Mountain, 4-Wheel Trailer". Early correspondence of the ATSF refer to this type as "New Mountains". The Santa Fe never adopted the "Northern" designation. 
 "Big Apple" on the Central of Georgia Railway (CG).
 "Confederation" on the Canadian National Railway (CN), named because they were purchased in 1927, the 60th anniversary of Canada's confederation in 1867. The "Confederation" 4-8-4s  were later renamed by the CN to the generic "Northern" name in later years.
 "Dixie" on the Nashville, Chattanooga and St. Louis Railway (NC&StL).
 "Golden State" on the Southern Pacific Railroad (SP), temporarily renamed "General Service" during the Second World War and also referred to as "GS" by Western Pacific for those GSs which were diverted to the WP from SP's order by the War Production Board.
 "Greenbrier" on the Chesapeake and Ohio Railway (C&O).
 "J" on the Norfolk and Western Railway (N&W).
 "FEF" (Four-Eight-Four) on the Union Pacific Railroad (UP).
 "Niagara" on the New York Central Railroad (NYC).
 "Pocono" on the Delaware, Lackawanna and Western Railroad (Lackawanna).
 "Potomac" on the Western Maryland Railway (WM).
 "Western" on the Denver and Rio Grande Western Railroad (Rio Grande).
 "Wyoming" on the Lehigh Valley Railroad (LV).

The Richmond, Fredericksburg and Potomac Railroad (RFP) gave each of its three  classes a separate name, the "General" of 1937, the "Governor" of 1938 and the "Statesman" of 1944.

Demise
Henry Bowen, the Chief Mechanical Engineer of the Canadian Pacific Railway (CPR) from 1928 to 1949, tested the first two CPR K-1a Northerns introduced by his predecessor, then he designed a  Selkirk type using the same boiler. In a later variant, Bowen added a booster to the trailing truck, enabling the Selkirk to exert nearly 50% more tractive effort than the similar-sized K-1a Northern.

When it was demonstrated that a three-unit EMD F3 diesel-electric consist that weighed slightly less than the total engine and tender mass of a CPR K-1a Northern could produce nearly three times its tractive effort, high-powered steam locomotives were retired as quickly as finance allowed.

Usage

Australia
A total of twenty-three  locomotives operated in Australia, built to three distinct designs.

In 1929, the ten  gauge South Australian Railways 500 class  Mountain types of 1926 were equipped with steam boosters in the form of small auxiliary steam engines to increase their power. This necessitated the replacement of their two-wheel trailing trucks with four-wheel bogies. The booster contributed an additional  to the tractive effort and permitted an increase in the locomotive's load across the Mount Lofty Ranges to 540 tons. In their new  configuration, they were reclassified to 500B class.

In 1943, the first of twelve streamlined South Australian Railways 520 class locomotives were delivered from the Islington Workshops in Adelaide. Although they were large locomotives, they were designed to run on lightly constructed  track, with the engine's weight being spread over eight axles. Their -diameter coupled wheels were specially balanced for  running.

The H class three-cylinder  of the Victorian Railways, built in 1941, was designed for heavy passenger work on the line between Melbourne and Adelaide. Nicknamed Heavy Harry, it was the largest steam locomotive built in Australia and, after the NSWGR D57 4-8-2, the second-most-powerful non-articulated locomotive. It was one of the five Australian classes of three-cylinder  locomotives.

Construction of three locomotives commenced at the Newport Workshops in 1939 and three sets of frames were manufactured. Although work was halted due to the outbreak of the Second World War, a shortage of motive power caused by increased wartime traffic resulted in authorisation being given for the completion of class leader H220. The locomotive went into service on 7 February 1941, but remained the sole member of the class because the other two partly-built locomotives were never completed. Since the necessary upgrades to the Adelaide line was deferred, H220 operated only on the line between Melbourne and Albury in New South Wales.

Brazil
To meet the acute locomotive shortages in Brazil after the Second World War, 27 scaled down American  Niágara locomotives were ordered by the Brazilian  (DNEF) from ALCO in 1946. They were designated the 1001 class. In 1956 and 1957, some of them were sold to Bolivia.

In 1949, a contract was signed between DNEF and GELSA for the construction of 24  locomotives with a  axle load. The order also included 66  Berkshires. All ninety locomotives were delivered by January 1953.

The 24 class 242F Niágara locomotives were built by Société de Construction des Batignolles (Batignolles-Châtillon). The Belpaire firebox included a combustion chamber and the boiler pressure was a high . One member of the class was tested on the  Reseau Breton line in France before being shipped to Brazil.

The DNEF allocated the locomotives to four of Brazil's state railways. Under Brazilian railway conditions, these modern locomotives were not popular with local railwaymen and were not used as much as had been hoped. Their maximum axle load of  restricted their usefulness, as did their long tenders. In some places the turntables were too short to turn the locomotives and they had to be turned on triangles. This last point proved to be a source of contention when it was later discovered that the curves in some places were of less than  radius. As a consequence, the locomotives were involved in a number of derailments.

In the late 1960s, they were relegated down from first class passenger trains. Some locomotives, allocated to Southern Brazil, were also tried in Bolivia.

Canada

When the Canadian National Railway (CN) introduced its first  in 1927, it used the name "Confederation" for the type, to celebrate the 60th anniversary of the Canadian Confederation. The CN employed a total of 160 Confederation locomotives.

 Altogether forty locomotives were delivered in 1927, twenty Class U-2-a from the Canadian Locomotive Company and twenty Class U-2-b from the Montreal Locomotive Works (MLW).
 Another twenty Class U-2-c came from MLW in 1929 and another five Class U-2-d, also from MLW, in 1936.
 The CN U-4a was one of the few streamlined Confederation types, with five locomotives built by MLW and also introduced in 1936. U-4a No. 6400 achieved fame in 1939 by heading the Royal Train and being exhibited at the New York World's Fair in the same year.
 Between 1940 and 1944, a total of ninety more Confederation locomotives, built in four batches, were added to the CN roster.

The Canadian Pacific Railway (CPR) experimented with the  wheel arrangement in 1928, when two K-1a class locomotives were built in its Angus shops in Montreal, the first locomotives to be built with a one-piece cast-steel frame in Canada. However, since the CPR mainlines were built to high standards, the railway preferred to develop the  Hudson type for passenger work since it gave adequate power and was cheaper to maintain, while a ten-coupled type, the  Selkirk, was adopted for heavy-duty work. Nevertheless, although the two CPR Northerns remained orphans, they proved their worth continuously for 25 years on overnight passenger trains between Montreal and Toronto. Before their retirement in 1960, they were converted to oil-burners and worked freight trains in the prairie provinces.

Chile
They were called  (Super Mountains), since they followed the   Mountain that was introduced six years earlier. They were equipped with mechanical stokers and Vanderbilt tenders and weighed 185 tonnes in working order. The design was not repeated, however, and the FdE returned to the  wheel arrangement with its subsequent acquisitions. The  was used on the line from Almeda to Talca until it was replaced by diesels in 1969. One of them, no. 1009, is preserved in the Santiago Railway Museum.

China

In 1933, the Beijing–Hankou Railway in China needed new locomotives for their Guangzhou to Shaoguan line, where gradients of around two percent, curves with less than  radius and low capacity bridges existed. The requirement was therefore for a locomotive with high tractive effort and a low axle load. In 1935 and 1936, 24 600-series  locomotives, designed and built in the United Kingdom by Vulcan Foundry, were delivered to the railway. The locomotives represented a significant improvement over previous designs and incorporated a more efficient E-type superheater and duplex steam valve to allow better steaming without enlarging the boiler, while the  wheel arrangement allowed better weight distribution.

When the Changsha–Guangzhou Railway was completed in October 1936, the locomotives were transferred to operate over the northern section between Hankou and Changsha on this new mainline, which connected Guangzhou with Tianjin and Peking.

Following the establishment of the People's Republic of China, the locomotives were designated the China Railways KF class. Some of the locomotives survived in service until the early 1970s. One of them, no. 607, is preserved at the National Railway Museum in the United Kingdom  and another is in China at the Beijing Railway Museum.

Czechoslovakia
The 60 T tank engines of Czechoslovak State Railways' 477 class represent the ultimate development of the CKD 4-8-2 tender locomotive, but added a four-wheel trailing truck as part of the conversion to a tank locomotive.  One of five classes of three cylinder  locomotives known, they were the last steam locomotives delivered to the Czechoslovak State Railways, with the last group built in 1955. Used primarily in local passenger service, they were pulling regularly timetabled trains as late as 1991. 

Three are preserved, as of 2018 two of them were still operational (013 and 043).

France
It also had the distinction, along with an experimental high pressure locomotive of the New York Central Railroad in the United States, of being one of the two compound . It was rebuilt by Andre Chapelon from the unsuccessful 1932 three-cylinder  simple expansion locomotive no. 241.101 of the  into a  compound locomotive. This remarkable locomotive achieved extraordinary power outputs and efficiency in coal and water consumption, but no further examples were built since the SNCF focused on electric traction for its future motive power development.

The 242A1 was put through trials on many test runs which showed that this locomotive was equal in power output to the existing SNCF electric locomotives at the time. Here, for the first time in Europe, was a steam locomotive with a  axle load which was not only at least as powerful as the most powerful existing high-speed electric locomotive, but which could repeatedly achieve its maximum power without any mechanical trouble.

While the 242A1 was being tested, electrical engineers were designing the locomotives for the  line between Paris and Lyon, which was to be electrified. An electric locomotive that was to be slightly more powerful than the successful Paris to Orléans 2-D-2 type electric locomotive was being contemplated. When the test results of the 242A1 became known, however, the design was hurriedly changed to incorporate the maximum capacity possible with a  axle load, resulting in the  9100 class with a power output of more than  more than that of the original design.

The performances of the Mistral and other heavy passenger express trains would therefore not have been so outstanding if the 242A1 had not existed and Andre Chapelon therefore indirectly influenced French electric locomotive design. In addition, the 242A1 demonstrated the suitability of the Sauvage-Smith system of compounding for French conditions and the designs for future French steam locomotives that were prepared but never produced, were to make use of the Sauvage-Smith compounding system.

It did not remain in service long, however, and was withdrawn and scrapped in 1960.

Germany
In 1939, the Deutsche Reichsbahn placed two prototype three-cylinder DRB Class 06 2D2-h3 heavy express locomotives in service, built by Krupp in 1938. Due to the outbreak of the Second World War and construction problems, only the two locomotives were produced.

Many parts, such as the boiler, were standardised with that of the DRG Class 45 heavy freight locomotive. The streamlined Class 06, the only German , was the biggest steam locomotive ever built in Germany. The two locomotives were shedded in Frankfurt and were placed in service on the line to Erfurt. No. 06.002 was bombed and destroyed during the hostilities and no. 06.001 survived until 1951, when it was retired and scrapped.

The boiler of both the 06 and 45 were designed along the lines of Robert Garbe and Richard Paul "Kunibald" Wagner, who held that a combustion chamber or double-expansion compound steam engines were unnecessary when using superheated steam. While the DB railways in the FRG salvaged the Class 45 design by fitting it with a badly-needed mechanical stoker, there was no need for the powerful Class 06 Express locos; when express traffic resumed, DB Class V 200 and DB Class E 10 Diesel-hydraulic and AC electric engines made any investment into pre-World War II steam engines unacceptable for the DB leadership even though Friedrich Witte or Adolph Giesl-Gieslingen proposed many improvements.

Mexico
These QR-1 class locomotives were used mainly on lines north of Mexico City and were nicknamed . All were taken out of service in the late 1960s. Most survived and  No. 3028, although not in operating condition, was stored on the deadline at the New Hope and Ivyland Railroad in New Hope, Pennsylvania.

New Zealand

After the Soviet Union and South Africa, the New Zealand Railways Department (NZR) had the largest fleet of  locomotives outside North America, with 71 similar locomotives in the K class, KA class and KB class.

The K class was designed by R.J. Gard to the requirements of Locomotive Superintendent P.R. Angus and was built locally at the Hutt Workshops of the NZR. The first locomotives were delivered during the depths of the Great Depression in 1932. The  grate and comparatively large boiler was slung low on a narrow frame to keep within the height restrictions, and width restrictions were adhered to with sloped cab sides and the mounting of two single stage air compressors in front of the smokebox.

After the construction of thirty K class locomotives, the NZR developed the design to strengthen the frame and introduced other improvements, such as roller bearings on all axles and ACFI feedwater heaters. Introduced from 1939, they were also built in NZR workshops, most of them with streamlined shrouding to cover the external pipe work of their feedwater heater systems. The first 35 locomotives were designated KA class and worked on the North Island mainlines with the older K class locomotives.

Six more were built, designated KB class, for service on the steeply graded Midland line on the South Island.

The streamlining shrouds of the KA and KB classes were removed in the late 1940s when the ACFI feedwater heaters were replaced with exhaust steam injectors. The last of these locomotives was withdrawn in 1968 due to dieselisation. Seven have been preserved, K class numbers 900, 911 and 917, KA class numbers 935, 942 and 945 and KB class no. 968.

South Africa

Between 1953 and 1955, the South African Railways (SAR) placed fifty Class 25NC  Northern locomotives in service. Designed under the direction of Chief Mechanical Engineer L.C. Grubb, eleven of these locomotives were built by North British Locomotive Company (NBL) and 39 by Henschel & Son. They were tended by Type EW1 tenders which rode on six-wheeled bogies. Two versions of the same locomotive were built, the Class 25NC being the non-condensing version, hence the "NC" suffix to the class number.

Ninety Class 25 condensing locomotives were introduced simultaneously, acquired as a means to deal with the shortage of adequate supplies of suitable locomotive water in the arid Karoo. The design work on the engine's condensing apparatus and the enormous condensing tender was carried out by Henschel, who built one locomotive complete with tender as well as sixty of the condensing tenders, to which they held the patent. The other 89 condensing locomotives and thirty tenders were built by NBL.

The Type CZ condensing tenders were slightly longer than their engines. One-third of the total length of the tender was taken up by the water tank and coal bunker, while the rest was taken up by eight large radiators on each side, cooled by five steam-driven roof-mounted fans. Roller bearings were used throughout on all these locomotives, including the coupling and connecting rods, the crosshead gudgeon pins as well as the three-axle bogies of both the standard and condensing tenders. The leading bogies and coupled wheels had Cannon-type axle boxes. The cylinders and frames were cast in one piece, while the steel cylinders and steam chests were fitted with cast iron liners. The tender frames of both locomotive types were also one-piece steel water-bottom castings. Since they were entirely mounted on roller bearings, very little effort was required to move these big locomotives.

On the condensing locomotives, spent steam was recycled and condensed back to water for repeated use. Since the steam was not expelled up the chimney, the smokebox contained a steam turbine-driven fan beneath the chimney to keep the draught going. Visual evidence of this altered and slightly longer smokebox is the locomotive's banjo-face smokebox front. In addition, the hot condensate feedwater resulted in significantly reduced coal consumption.

However, the Class 25 was a complex locomotive that required high maintenance, especially on the turbine blower fans in the smokebox, whose blades needed to be replaced frequently due to damage by solid particles in the exhaust. The equally complex condensing tender also required frequent maintenance. Between 1973 and 1980, partly motivated by the spread of electric and diesel-electric traction, all but three of the locomotives were converted to free-exhausting and non-condensing locomotives and reclassified to Class 25NC. In the process their condensing tenders were also rebuilt to ordinary coal-and-water tenders by removing the condensing radiators and roof fans and replacing it with a massive round-topped water tank. Since the tenders were built on single cast-steel main frames, it was impractical to attempt to shorten them. Locomotives with these rebuilt Type EW2 tenders were soon nicknamed  (Sausage dog or Dachshund).

The Class 26, popularly known as the Red Devil, was rebuilt from Henschel-built Class 25NC no. 3450 by mechanical engineer David Wardale. The rebuilding took place at the Salt River shops of the SAR in Cape Town and was based on the principles developed by Argentinian mechanical engineer Livio Dante Porta. The primary objectives of the modifications were to improve the combustion and steaming rate to reduce the emission of wasteful black smoke and to overcome the problem of clinkering. This was achieved by the use of a Gas Producer Combustion System (GPCS), which relies on the gasification of coal on a low temperature firebed so that the gases are then fully burnt above the firebed. The GPCS minimises the amount of air being drawn up through the firebed, the main source of air required for combustion being through ancillary air intakes located on the firebox sides above the firebed.

The modified locomotive became the only Class 26. Compared to an unmodified Class 25NC, the Red Devil achieved a 28% measured saving on coal and a 30% measured saving on water, measured during freight service, and a 43% increase in drawbar power based on the maximum recorded drawbar power. Its approximate maximum range in full load freight service on 1% to % grades was  based on its coal capacity, and  based on its water capacity. The Red Devil great power, however, also turned out to be its one weakness. The Class 25NC had already proven to be on the slippery side and the much more powerful Class 26, with essentially still the same dimensions as the Class 25NC, was even worse. It was a poor performer at starting or at low speeds on steep gradients.

Soviet Union
As the last Soviet standard class steam locomotive, the Class P36 shared some common components and design attributes with earlier standard Soviet designs such as the L class  Decapod type and LV class  Santa Fe type, as well as some common attributes with the P34 class  Mallet and P38 class  Yellowstone type Mallet. For example, the P36 and LV classes shared the same feedwater heater, made by the Bryansk machine factory. Apart from a trio of fully streamlined  Baltic-type locomotives, they were the only semi-streamlined steam locomotives built in Russia. 

The Class P36 was one of the best passenger steam locomotive classes built in the Soviet Union.

The Class P36 first appeared on the Oktyabrskaya Railway (October Railway) to haul principal express trains between Moscow and Leningrad, but they did not remain on this  mainline long. Diesels took over after only a few years and the P36 class locomotives were transferred to other lines and depots, such as the Moscow–Kursk and Moscow–Ryazan lines, Kalinin, Krasnoyarsk, Belarusian Railway, Melitopol depot, Kuibyshev and Alexandrov depot. 

Later, when electrification and dieselisation expanded, many of the Class P36 locomotives were transferred to work on the Lviv, Far East, Eastern Siberia, and Transbaikal Railways. The last was withdrawn from regular scheduled express passenger train service in 1974. All were staged in full working order and kept in reserve for times of extraordinary demand. At certain intervals, the locomotives were taken out from staging, steamed up and put to work to haul trains to test the condition of the locomotives. In the late 1980s, these strategic reserves of locomotives were disbanded and the Class P36 locomotives were distributed to museums and for preservation. Some that had not seen regular use for more than fifteen years and were in the worst mechanical condition, were scrapped. It was found that the roller bearings suffered most by standing unused. When the computerised new class numbers were introduced by the Russian Ministry of Railways, the Class P36 were designated Class 1000.0001 to 1000.0251. In the 1990s, after the collapse of the Soviet Union, a number were sold to private train operators.

Spain
Developed from a preceding  Mountain type, they had improved steam passages and developed 30 to 40 per cent more power at medium cut-offs and high speed. To increase the comfort of the locomotive crew, the cabs had wooden floors mounted on springs, and the seats of the driver and fireman were also sprung, a very welcome improvement for long runs on poor tracks. These locomotives were painted in a green livery when turned out from the builder's works at Barcelona and were consequently nicknamed  (The Greens). 

The 242F class was the fastest Spanish steam locomotive. When tested on the line from Barcelona to Tarragona across  of practically level and straight line between Vilanova i la Geltrú and Sant Vicent, a speed exceeding  was sustained twice, first with a train of 430 tons and then with a train of 480 tons. The gross horsepower figures recorded with the dynamometer car were 1790, 2350 and 2320 respectively, the calculated horsepower on the rail being 2600, 3400 and 3580.

With these locomotives, there was some concern about water supply. The capacity of the tender was limited at only  and, with few watering points in service, the full capacity of the locomotive was not always used for fear of running short of this essential commodity in the semi-arid Spanish landscape.

All ten locomotives were allocated to the Miranda de Ebro shed to haul principal heavy express trains. In the 1960s, they were a familiar sight at the head of the premier express trains, but in 1971 they were transferred entirely to semi-fast passenger trains and even to the haulage of heavy seasonal fruit trains between Castejón and Alsasua from October to January. One locomotive, no. 242F.2009, is preserved at the Madrid Railway Museum.

United Kingdom
While no steam locomotives were known to be this type, an experimental diesel-mechanical locomotive, the British Rail 10100, had this wheel arrangement, but it was scrapped after a gearbox failure caused a loss of interest in the project.

United States

Exceptionally heavy 4-8-4s were therefore introduced on the Atchison, Topeka and Santa Fe (Santa Fe), Chicago and North Western (CNW), Chesapeake and Ohio (C&O), Milwaukee Road (MILW), Northern Pacific (NP), Norfolk and Western (N&W), Spokane, Portland and Seattle (SP&S) and Western Maryland (WM) railroads.

Some 4-8-4s were used on exceptionally long runs.
 The Santa Fe Heavy Mountains were rostered to haul the Chief and Fast Mail trains between La Junta, Colorado and Los Angeles across , and also handled the Grand Canyon Limited between Los Angeles and Wellington, Kansas, across .
 The Niagaras of the New York Central Railroad (NYC) also accomplished long runs on New York to Chicago passenger trains, including the Chicagoan and the Commodore Vanderbilt.
 The Northern Pacific  hauled the North Coast Limited across  from St. Paul, Minnesota, to Livingston, Montana.

Several of the earlier  locomotive models were modified or rebuilt during their service lives.
 Santa Fe developed their 4-8-4s for years, and named the classes based on the number of the first locomotive in the class. Engine no. 3752 was equipped with Franklin rotary cam poppet valve gear and achieved the very low steam rate of 13.5 lb per indicated horsepower-hour (2.28 mg/J).
Some years later, 24 of them underwent another rebuild which included new nickel-steel frames, new cylinders, pilot beams and air reservoirs, new fireboxes and other minor improvements. These were reclassified as Class H-1.
 The S-2 Class Northerns of the Great Northern Railway were rebuilt to have Timken roller bearings on every axle in 1945, replacing their original plain bearings. Vestibule cabs were added to engine 2577 in the early 1930s and engines 2582, 2586, 2587 and 2588 by the late 1940s.

Some Northern locomotives were also rebuilt from older engines. Between 1945 and 1947, the Reading Railroad rebuilt thirty of their heavy I-10 class  Consolidations to booster-fitted  Northern locomotives with  diameter driving wheels. Four syphons were fitted, three in the firebox proper and one in the combustion chamber. A new cast-steel frame was used, with the cylinders cast integral and roller bearings on all axles. They were reclassified to T1 and numbered 2100 to 2129. Two of these locomotives, preserved for hauling special trains, were still in use in 1963.

The Northerns were workhorses that went without much public recognition, with a few exceptions. The Class GS-4 Golden State locomotives of Southern Pacific (SP), of which 36 were built by Lima Locomotive Works in 1941 and 1942, were semi-streamlined and were given a striking livery with a broad orange valence over the wheels below a narrow red band that came halfway up the cab windows. The locomotives headed the Coast Daylight train on the railroad's Coast Line between Los Angeles and San Francisco. The television program The Adventures of Superman was introduced with a shot of an SP GS-4 as the announcer declared that Superman was "more powerful than a locomotive." One of them, GS-4 no. 4449, has been restored and is in operating condition.

Even after the demise of steam, the Northern type has been in the spotlight of publicity and, along with Union Pacific no. 844 of the Union Pacific FEF Series and Norfolk and Western no. 611 of the Norfolk and Western Class J series, among other Northerns, have been the favoured type to provide mainline excursions in the United States. The former is the only steam locomotive of a Class I railroad never to have been retired.

North American production list
Most North American s were built by ALCO, Lima and the Baldwin Locomotive Works, while Canadian National Railway's fleet was built by Montreal Locomotive Works. Only the Canadian Pacific Railway, the Norfolk and Western Railway, the St. Louis Southwestern Railway (Cotton Belt) and the Reading Railroad built or rebuilt their own. The Missouri Pacific rebuilt one class of their s from their class BK-63 2-8-4s.

The Northern type was used by 37 railroads in the Americas, including 31 railroads in the United States, three in Canada, one in Mexico and two in Brazil. In all, there were fewer than 1,200 locomotives of this type in North America, compared to the approximately 2,500  Mountain types and 6,800  Pacific types. By far the largest fleet was owned by the CN and its subsidiary, the Grand Trunk Western Railroad, with altogether 203 locomotives.

Preservation by country
Many more were therefore preserved than other older wheel arrangements, either plinthed or in museums, with several being kept in running condition. Some of the more notable preserved Northerns worldwide are listed here by country of origin.

 Australia
 South Australian Railways 520: Restored to service in 1972, operating the SteamRanger tourist railway between Mount Barker and Victor Harbor at the time.
 South Australian Railways 523: on static display at the National Railway Museum, Port Adelaide.
 Victorian Railways H220: On static display at the Newport Railway Museum in Melbourne, this locomotive is the only surviving three-cylinder example of a 4-8-4.

 Canada
 Canadian National 6153: On static display at the Canadian Railway Museum in Delson, Quebec.
 Canadian National 6167: On static display in downtown Guelph, Ontario.
 Canadian National 6200: Canadian Science & Technology Museum, Ottawa, Ontario.
 Canadian National 6213: On static display in downtown Toronto, Ontario, at the Toronto Railway Heritage Centre.
 Canadian National 6218: Fort Erie Railroad Museum, Fort Erie, Ontario. Used by the CN on excursions in the 1960s and 1970s.
 Canadian National 6400: Canadian Science & Technology Museum, Ottawa, Ontario.
 Canadian Pacific 3100: Canadian Science & Technology Museum, Ottawa, Ontario.
 Canadian Pacific 3101: On display at EVRAZ (formerly IPSCO Steel), Regina, Saskatchewan.
 Grand Trunk Western 6323: On display at the Illinois Railway Museum in Union, Illinois.
 Grand Trunk Western 6325: Restored in 2001 by the Ohio Central Railroad, owned by Age of Steam Roundhouse, Sugarcreek, Ohio. Currently, the locomotive needs valve and running gear work.

 China
 Class KF1 006: Displayed at the China Railway Museum, Beijing.
 Class KF 7: Displayed at the National Railway Museum, York, England.

Mexico 
 N de M 3027: Guadalajara, Jalisco.
 N de M 3028: Retired in 1966, acquired by the Great North Eastern Railroad Foundation, and displayed at the Altamont, New York, fairgrounds until 1983. On lease to the New Hope and Ivyland Railroad.
 N de M 3030: Zacatecas, Zacatecas.
 N de M 3031: Huehuetoca, Mexico.
 N de M 3033: Pachuca, Hidalgo.
 N de M 3034: Puebla, Puebla.
 N de M 3035: Aguascalientes, Aguascalientes.
 N de M 3036: Leon, Guanajuato.
 N de M 3038: Mexico City.
 N de M 3039: Monterrey, Nuevo Leon.
 N de M 3040: Oriental, Puebla.
 N de M 3056: Tequisuiapan, Queretaro.

 New Zealand
 K 900: On static display at the Museum of Transport & Technology, Auckland
 K 911: Under overhaul by the Mainline Steam Heritage Trust, Plimmerton.
 K 917: Stored, missing many parts, Steam Incorporated, Paekakariki.
 KA 935: Awaiting overhaul at the Silver Stream Railway, near Wellington, New Zealand.
 KA 942: In service at the Mainline Steam Heritage Trust, Plimmerton. Was used on mainline excursions.
 KA 945: Stored in dismantled condition at Steam Incorporated, Paekakariki.
 KB 968: Owned by the Canterbury Railway Society, leased to the Mainline Steam Heritage Trust. Under overhaul at Christchurch.

 South Africa
 Class 25 3511: Condenser, staged at Beaconsfield, Kimberley.
 Class 25NC 3405: Displayed at the Buckinghamshire Railway Centre, Quainton, England
 Class 25NC 3432: Stored at Mainline Steam, Auckland, New Zealand.
 Class 25NC 3437: Owned by Steamnet 2000, restored and steamed in April 2017.
 Class 25NC 3442: Operated by Rovos Rail, Capital Park, Pretoria.
 Class 25NC 3454: Ex condenser with dual Lempor exhaust, staged at Bloemfontein.
 Class 25NC 3484: Ex condenser, operated by Rovos Rail, Capital Park, Pretoria.
 Class 25NC 3508: Stored at Mainline Steam, Auckland, New Zealand.
 Class 25NC 3533: Ex condenser, operated by Rovos Rail, Capital Park, Pretoria.
 Class 26 3450: The Red Devil, staged at Monument Station, Cape Town.

 Soviet Union
 P36-0001: Restored to working order at Roslavl in 2005. Currently displayed at Rizhsky Station, Moscow.
 P36-0027: Tikhoretsk for restoration to working order.
 P36-0031: Troitsk in working order.
 P36-0032: The only private steam locomotive operated in Russia, owned by GW Travel.
 P36-0050: Brest Railway Museum.
 P36-0058: Zlatoust derelict.
 P36-0064: Brest Railway Museum, Belarus Railways.
 P36-0071: Cosmetically restored and on display in Nizhny Novgorod.
 P36-0091: Skovorodino station.
 P36-0094: Belogorsk station.
 P36-0096: Severobaik station.
 P36-0097: Seyatel Station Museum.
 P36-0107: Park near Irkutsk.
 P36-0110: Mogzhon station.
 P36-0111: Orsha station, Belarus.
 P36-0120: Now restored to working order at Tikhoretsk. Returned to Moscow 03/09/13 for the '1520 Railway Exhibition' at Scherbinka. Currently based in Moscow.
 P36-0123: Prora Museum, Ruegen Island, Germany.
 P36-0124: Chernyshevsk depot.
 P36-0147: Sharya station.
 P36-0182: Cosmetically restored and on display in Chelyabinsk.
 P36-0192: Taiga station.
 P36-0218: Tikhoretsk/Bataysk, restored to working order.
 P36-0228: Uulan Baatar Railway Museum, Mongolia.
 P36-0232: Cosmetically restored at Zlatoust in 2009 for display in Samara. May display a different number.
 P36-0249: Shushary Railway Museum, St. Petersburg.
 P36-0250: Tashkent Railway Museum, Uzbekistan.
 P36-0251: Warsaw Station Museum, St. Petersburg.

 Spain
 RENFE242F-2009: Retired in 1973, restored in 1989, and another time in 2005. Although in running order, it is usually on static display at the Museo del Ferrocarril, housed in the former Delicias Railway Station.

 United States
 Atchison, Topeka & Santa Fe 2903: On display at the Illinois Railway Museum in Union, Illinois.
 Atchison, Topeka & Santa Fe 2912: On static display in Pueblo, Colorado.
 Atchison, Topeka & Santa Fe 2913: On display in Fort Madison, Iowa.
 Atchison, Topeka & Santa Fe 2921: On display at the Amtrak Station in Modesto, California.
 Atchison, Topeka & Santa Fe 2925: On display at the California State Railroad Museum in Sacramento, California.
 Atchison, Topeka & Santa Fe 2926: Currently under restoration for excursion service in Albuquerque at a site leased from the GSA near 8th Street and Haynes Avenue. More information at New Mexico Steam Locomotive and Railroad Historical Society.
 Atchison, Topeka & Santa Fe 3751: Restored in 1991, owned by the San Bernardino Railroad Historical Society, and is operated in excursion service. It is the oldest surviving , the first one to be built by the Baldwin Locomotive Works and the first  to be built for the Santa Fe.
 Atchison, Topeka & Santa Fe 3759: On Display in Kingman, Arizona.
 Atchison, Topeka & Santa Fe 3768: On display at the Great Plains Transportation Museum in Wichita, Kansas.
 Chesapeake and Ohio 614: Restored in 1980 and again in 1995, owned by Iron Horse Enterprise, Clifton Forge, Virginia.
 Chicago, Burlington and Quincy 5614: On display at Patee Park in St. Joseph, Missouri.
 Chicago, Burlington, and Quincy 5629: On display at the Colorado Railroad Museum in Golden, Colorado.
 Chicago, Burlington, and Quincy 5631: On display at Rotary Park in Sheridan, Wyoming.
 Chicago, Burlington, and Quincy 5633: On display at the Douglas Railroad Interpretive Center, Douglas, Wyoming.
 Grand Trunk Western 6323: On display at the Illinois Railway Museum in Union, Illinois.
 Great Northern 2584: On display at the Havre depot in Havre, Montana.
 Milwaukee Road 261: Restored in 1993, owned, maintained, and operated by the Friends of the 261 in Minneapolis, Minnesota.
 Milwaukee Road 265: On display at the Illinois Railway Museum in Union, Illinois.
 Nashville, Chattanooga, and St. Louis 576, Nashville, Tennessee - Presently undergoing Restoration.
 Norfolk and Western 611: Ran frequent excursions in the 1980s and early 1990s, then placed on static display at the Virginia Museum of Transportation, Roanoke, Virginia. The second restoration to operational condition completed in June 2015 at the North Carolina Transportation Museum, Spencer, North Carolina.
 Reading 2100: Restored in 1988 and 1998, converted to burn oil in the Early 2000s. On long-term lease to the American Steam Railroad. Currently under restoration to operating condition.
 Reading 2101: On display at the B&O Railroad Museum in Baltimore, Maryland.
 Reading 2102: Reading & Northern Railroad, Port Clinton, Pennsylvania, has been restored to operating condition in April 2022.
 Reading 2124: Used on the "Reading Rambles" in the late 1950s and 1960s. On display at Steamtown National Historic Site in Scranton, Pennsylvania.
 819: Built in 1943, it was the last locomotive built by the Cotton Belt and the last Cotton Belt steam locomotive built. Restored to service in 1986 and housed at the Arkansas Railroad Museum in Pine Bluff, Arkansas.
 St. Louis-San Francisco 4500: As the Frisco Meteor, ran overnight passenger service between St. Louis, Tulsa and Oklahoma City. Cosmetically restored and relocated in 2011 to the Route 66 Historical Village at 3770 Southwest Blvd in Tulsa, Oklahoma.
 St. Louis-San Francisco 4501: Built in 1942, ran overnight passenger service as the Frisco Meteor between St. Louis, Tulsa, and Oklahoma City. Donated to the Dallas Museum of the American Railroad in September 1964.
 St. Louis-San Francisco 4516: On display at the Missouri State Fairgrounds in Sedalia, Missouri.
 St. Louis-San Francisco 4524: On display at Grant Beach Park in Springfield, Missouri. This was the last steam locomotive built for the Frisco.
 Spokane, Portland and Seattle 700: Restored in 1990 by the Oregon Rail Heritage Foundation, and is operated in excursion service. No. 700 is stored at the Oregon Rail Heritage Center in Portland, Oregon, along with SP 4449. It is the only surviving original Spokane, Portland and Seattle railway steam locomotive.
 Southern Pacific 4449: Still in operation, served as the locomotive for the Bicentennial American Freedom Train. Stored at the Oregon Rail Heritage Center in Portland, Oregon along with SPS 700.
 Southern Pacific 4460: On display at the National Museum of Transportation in St. Louis, Missouri. This was the last steam locomotive used in revenue service by SP. Full Restoration unlikely to happen due to boiler being sandblasted.
 [Union Pacific]] 814: On display at the Rock Island Depot Museum in Council Bluffs, Iowa.
 Union Pacific 833: On display at the Utah State Railroad Museum in Ogden, Utah.
 Union Pacific 838: Union Pacific Railroad, stored in Cheyenne, Wyoming. Used solely as a source of spare parts for sister engine 844.
 Union Pacific 844: Formerly Union Pacific 8444 is the last steam locomotive built for Union Pacific Railroad (12/1944). Part of UP heritage fleet, often used for running in excursion service, and on occasion revenue service. Never retired, it is the longest continuously operating steam locomotive on a Class 1 Railroad. Kept at Cheyenne, Wyoming, when not on excursion.

References

 
8,4-8-4